Manuel Berberian is an Iranian-Armenian earth scientist. He was born on the 27th of October, 1945 into an immigrant Armenian family in Tehran. He specializes in earthquake seismology, active faulting and folding, active tectonics, continental tectonics, historical seismicity, archaeoseismicity, earthquake hazard minimization, geological mapping, and environmental science and engineering.

Biography
Berberian was born on October 27, 1945 into an immigrant Armenian family in Tehran.  The family had previously fled Armenia during the Armenian genocide.

Berberian received his Ph.D. degree in geophysics/Earth Science, majoring in earthquake seismology and active tectonics from the University of Cambridge, United Kingdom, in June 1981. He is the second Iranian and the first Armenian receiving a Ph.D. degree in Earth Sciences from Cambridge.

Berberian is the founder of Tectonics and Seismotectonics Research studies in Iran.  He established the Research Department at the Geological Survey of Iran by the United Nations in 1972. Since 1971 he has been engaged in scholarly research,  He has taught at the University of Tehran,  Tarbiat Modares University, Tehran and Ocean County College in New Jersey.

Since 1990, Barberian, his wife and son are living in the United States.

Honors
2013: The First Iranian and First Armenian Earth Scientist ever honored by the Geological Society of America (GSA) during its 125th Anniversary Annual Conference Special Meeting Dedicated to his over 40-yr of research and contribution to the world Earth Science at Denver, Colorado, United States, in October 2013, Sessions 214 &  291, T188: Tethyan Evolution and Seismotectonics of Southwest Asia (GSA Structural Geology and Tectonics Division; GSA Quaternary Geology & Geomorphology Division; GSA Mineralogy, Geochemistry, Petrology, & Volcanology Division).

2008: A new fossil species of Chondrichthyes (jawed fish) named in honor of Berberian in recognition of his contribution to the tectonic evolution of the Iranian Plateau.

References

External links
 Manuel Berberian official website

Armenian geologists
Iranian geologists
Iranian expatriates in the United Kingdom
Iranian emigrants to the United States
American people of Armenian descent
Ethnic Armenian scientists
Living people
1945 births
Scientists from Tehran
Iranian people of Armenian descent